Dogma (stylized as DOGMA in Japan) is the eighth studio album by Japanese visual kei rock band the Gazette, released on August 26, 2015 in Japan and September 4, 2015 in the US by Sony Music and October 2, 2015 in the UK, Europe and Russia by JPU Records.

The album scored number 2 on its first day of release on the Oricon Daily Charts and number 3 on the Oricon Weekly Charts, selling 18,102 copies in its first week.

For DOGMA, the GazettE launched a very special project that goes beyond the music:the GazettE released its eigth studio-album on August 26th 2016. Titled ‘DOGMA’, the band does with it everything on a grand and beauty scales! The record is incorpored within the framework of a global conceptual scheme named ‘Project: Dark Age’ which marks the thirteenth anniversary of the combo. The project, which was launched over the course of March 2015, is being developed purposely through a range of thirteenth sub-projects represented graphically by a logo, a ring-shape dodecagon. The circle added to the twelve-sided polygon symbolizes the thirteeth line. The graphic choice, driven by the age of the band, is without a doubt well-thought since a twelve-star polygon is culturally linked to the Earthly Branches, an ancient means through which time is measured (duration, age). These sub-projects, commonly titled ‘movement’ — the notion of time is a corollary of the notion of movement — yet dissociated by ordinal numbers, are then revealed in further details in dribs and drabs. Album ‘DOGMA’, being the very first movement (located at the far north on the logo), is the core piece of the puzzle which encompasses other audiovisual and text elements created in association with 18 artists.

Track listing

Limited Edition

Regular Edition

Notes
 The album is mastered by one of the world’s most in-demand engineers, Ted Jensen of Sterling Sound.
 The second album release to use all English names in the album.

References

External links
 PS Company Official Website
 Sony Music Entertainment Japan Official Website

The Gazette (band) albums
2015 albums